Marville may refer to:

 Marville (comics), a Marvel Comics series from the early 2000s
 Marville, Meuse, a commune of the Meuse département, in France

People
Marie Marville (1873-1961), French actress